The Arctic Institute – Center for Circumpolar Security Studies, often referred to as The Arctic Institute or TAI, is an international think tank founded in 2011 and headquartered in Washington, D.C. The Institute's mission is to inform Arctic policy through interdisciplinary, inclusive research that addresses the most critical issues in the circumpolar Arctic. TAI is composed of researchers from around the world. The University of Pennsylvania's Global Go To Think Tank Index has consistently ranked The Arctic Institute among the top one hundred best think tanks in the United States since 2016. Lillian Hussong has served as the interim managing director since August 2021.

History 

The Arctic Institute was founded by Malte Humpert in 2011, who had worked as an energy consultant for the Inter-American Development Bank at the time. Humpert first encountered the Arctic during graduate school at Georgetown University in 2009, where he researched the impact of climate change on the European Union (EU) and EU security.

Humpert created The Arctic Institute in 2011 as a think tank devoted to multidisciplinary analysis of the Arctic. It was also created in response to the relative lack of think tanks with Arctic programs at the time. The Arctic Institute was therefore one of the first think tanks devoted exclusively to the Arctic through broad geographic and thematic lenses. TAI grew from an individual operation with weekly stories to half a dozen staff members in less than a year.

In 2012 The Arctic Institute launched "The Arctic this Week" (TATW), a weekly newsletter that listed news articles about Arctic-related politics and military developments, as well as economic issues related to mining, energy, and infrastructure. TATW also included news about scientific research and the health and wellness of those living in the Arctic. TATW is credited with increasing the institute's digital visibility, having shared over 90,000 news articles since 2012 with readers in more than 90 countries.

Since 2012, the Arctic Institute has worked with a number of external partners, including the Arctic Frontiers conference, and with the High North Center for Business & Development at Nord University on the annual High North Dialogue (formerly Arctic Dialogue).

Victoria Herrmann became the Institute's first President & Managing Director in 2015. The Arctic Institute significantly expanded its operations in 2016, hosting ten events across the world (up from two in 2015), increasing its presence on social media, and expanding its geographical reach to the United States, Denmark, Norway, Iceland, and Morocco. This led to it being shortlisted by Prospect Magazine for Best US Energy & Environment Think Tank that same year.

In 2017 The Arctic Institute increased its publication rate by 75% over the previous year, and in 2019, the Institute embarked on a new initiative to publish science education and policy infographics.

Organization 

The Arctic Institute is an organization of approximately forty staff members whose backgrounds include scholars, graduate and undergraduate students, non-profit workers, and journalists. It is led day to day by the managing director and the Leadership Group, which is composed of six staff members. The Leadership Group is responsible for advancing the institute's mission by developing new strategic initiatives and partnerships. It is also responsible for all communications and editorial operations. Staff include senior fellows, research associates, research assistants, interns, and visiting fellows, who focus on critical circumpolar Arctic research.

The board of directors provides governance of financial affairs, and safeguards the independence of the institute's work. Members include distinguished academics, former government officials, community leaders, and business executives. The board of advisors comprises distinguished figures in the Arctic research and policymaking communities, and offers advice to the institute on their research initiatives and connects staff members with research resources.

Presidents and Managing Directors 

Since becoming a 501(c)3, The Arctic Institute has been directed by Arctic researchers and experts.

Recent directors:

 Victoria Herrmann, PhD (2016 - 2021) 
 Lillian Hussong, PhD (2021 - 2022) (interim)
 Romain Chuffart (2022-)

Board of directors 

 David Slayton (former executive director of the Arctic Security Initiative, Stanford University Hoover Institution)
 Dave Walsh (communications and strategy consultant)
 Fran Ulmer (former lieutenant governor of Alaska and former Chair of the U.S. Arctic Research Commission)
 Heather Exner-Pirot (managing editor of the Arctic Yearbook)
 Jim Gamble (Arctic program director, Pacific Environment)
 Malte Humpert (founder of The Arctic Institute)
 Kuupik Kleist (fourth prime minister of Greenland)
 Lill Hilde Kaldager (former managing director of the Arctic Business Secretariat)
 Victoria Herrmann (former managing director of The Arctic Institute; on leave)

Board of advisors 

 John Crump (senior climate change advisor, GRID-Arendal Polar Center)
 Dr. John Farrell (executive director, U.S. Arctic Research Commission)
 Dr. Klaus Dodds (professor, Royal Holloway University) 
 Kristine Offerdal (dean, Forsvarets høgskole)
 Lassi Heininen (professor, University of Lapland)
 R. Andreas Kraemer (founder, Ecologic Institute)
 Udloriak Hanson (former deputy minister of the Government of Nunavut)
 Ambassador Þórður Ægir Óskarsson (public servant of the Government of Iceland)

Research and activities 
The institute's mission includes three approaches: research and analysis; engagement with partner organizations, scholars, communities, and knowledge-holders; and events, workshops, and meetings. It addresses circumpolar security issues through eight themes: economic security, military security, food security, health security, environmental security, cultural security, political security, energy security.

Projects 

 AlaskaNor: research on the opportunities of Alaska and North Norway to address the development of a "blue economy"
 Climate Action: research on environmental issues in the Arctic, which is warming twice as fast as the global average
 Arctic Migrations: research on how climate change impacts globalization and urbanization along Arctic coastlines
 Smart Cities: research on how emerging technologies (such as fiber optics) impact local communities and regions and connect with international communities
 Ocean Governance: research on the impacts of regional disputes and marine resources on ocean governance
 Early Career Development: promoting inclusion to support creativity in all matters of the Arctic. Initiatives include visiting fellowships, partnerships with virtual colleges, conferences, and programs that connect early-career Arctic professionals
 SvalFish: research on how the development of sustainable fisheries management in Svalbard may help business and decision-makers in the region
 GeoSeas: research on how potential shipping routes in the Arctic may influence the geopolitics of the region
 Northern Narratives: partnership with High North News to deliver cutting-edge coverage of the latest circumpolar Arctic developments

Collaboration 
The Arctic Institute has collaborated with a number of academic institutions, non-governmental organizations, non-profit organizations, businesses, and individuals. Current partnerships include:

 High North Center, Nord University
 BlanX
 Migration in Harmony - RCN, Georgetown University
 Women of the Arctic (Breaking the Ice Ceiling)
 Ecologic Institute for the Arctic College
 2018 Arctic Circle Assembly
 Arctic Summer College

Past partnerships included:

 Students on Ice
 J.Lindeberg, 1% for the Planet
 Why the Arctic Matters, U.S. Arctic Research Commission
Copenhagen Business School
Arctic Adaptation Exchange (Arctic Council)
 UK Nordic Innovations
 Korean Maritime Institute
 Global Landscapes Forum

Publications 
The Arctic Institute publishes over eighty peer-reviewed articles and commentaries annually.  Publications are authored by staff members and external contributors whose research addresses TAI's core research areas. These include peer-reviewed scholarly articles about critical topics in Arctic affairs, commentaries based on current events, and infographics and maps that display various thematic issues in the Arctic.

The institute's flagship publications include:

 The Arctic This Week (TATW), a weekly newsletter that includes recent TAI announcements and new TAI publications, as well as external news articles covering politics; energy; military; search and rescue; mining; science and the environment; industry, development, and infrastructure; and health, youth, society, and culture.
 Take 5, a news roundup of the top five most significant news stories that occurred in the circumpolar Arctic that week
 Map of the Month, a series of maps that detail circumpolar issues spanning shipping routes, oil and gas activities, indigenous knowledge, languages, wildlife and sea life migration, and infectious diseases
 TAI Bookshelf Podcast, a series of conversations with Arctic scholars and experts from around the world about the latest developments in the circumpolar Arctic

The Arctic Institute also launched an app in 2018 available on Android and Apple systems. The "TATW App" provides summaries of the latest circumpolar Arctic news.

Awards 
The Council on Foreign Relations listed Malte Humpert's report "The Future of Arctic Shipping: A New Silk Road for China?" as one of the "ten must-reads of the year" in 2013.

Prospect Magazine shortlisted The Arctic Institute in its 2017 edition of its annual Think Tank Awards for think tanks dedicated to U.S. energy and the environment.

The Arctic Institute has consistently been ranked as a Top 100 Think Tank in the United States by the University of Pennsylvania's Think Tanks and Civil Society Program since 2016. In 2021 it was ranked 72nd in the United States. It is the only think tank composed of early career scholars (who largely volunteer) to hold such a distinction.

References

External links 
 Website of The Arctic Institute
 Articles of Victoria Herrmann in The Guardian
 Americas Eroding Edges

Foreign policy and strategy think tanks in the United States
Non-profit organizations based in Washington, D.C.
2011 establishments in Washington, D.C.
Think tanks established in 2011
International relations
Arctic
Arctic research
Government of the Arctic